The 2020 South American Futsal World Cup qualifiers was a men's futsal tournament that was used as the South American qualifying tournament to determine the four CONMEBOL teams playing in the 2021 FIFA Futsal World Cup (originally 2020 but postponed due to COVID-19 pandemic) in Lithuania. The tournament was held in Carlos Barbosa, Brazil between 1–9 February 2020.

Brazil were the defending champions.

Champions Argentina, runners-up Brazil, third-placed Paraguay and fourth-placed Venezuela qualified for the 2021 FIFA Futsal World Cup as the CONMEBOL representatives.

Teams
All ten CONMEBOL member national teams entered the tournament.

Note: Statistics start from 2012 when a separate qualifying tournament was held. Prior to 2012, the Copa América de Futsal was used as the CONMEBOL qualifying tournament for the FIFA Futsal World Cup.

Venues
The matches were played at the Centro de Eventos Sérgio Luiz Guerra in Carlos Barbosa.

Draw
The draw of the tournament was held on 15 January 2020, 12:30 PYST (UTC−3), at the CONMEBOL headquarters in Luque, Paraguay. The hosts and holders, Brazil, and the previous tournament's runners-up, Argentina, were seeded in Groups A and B respectively, while the other eight teams were divided into four pots based on their results in the 2016 qualifiers, and were drawn to the remaining group positions.

Squads

Group stage
The top two teams of each group advance to the knockout stage and qualify for the 2021 FIFA Futsal World Cup.

Tiebreakers
The ranking of teams in the first stage is determined as follows (Regulations Article 8):
 Points obtained in all group matches (three points for a win, one for a draw, none for a defeat);
 Goal difference in all group matches;
 Number of goals scored in all group matches;
 Points obtained in the matches played between the teams in question;
 Goal difference in the matches played between the teams in question;
 Number of goals scored in the matches played between the teams in question;
 Fair play points in all group matches (only one deduction could be applied to a player in a single match): 
 Drawing of lots.

All times local, BRT (UTC−3).

Group A

Group B

Knockout stage
In the knockout stage, extra time and penalty shoot-out would be used to decide the winner if necessary (no extra time would be used in the play-offs for third to tenth place).

Bracket

Semi-finals

Ninth place play-off

Seventh place play-off

Fifth place play-off

Third place play-off

Final

Final ranking

Qualified teams for FIFA Futsal World Cup
The following four teams from CONMEBOL qualified for the 2021 FIFA Futsal World Cup.

1 Bold indicates champions for that year. Italic indicates hosts for that year.

References

External links
CONMEBOL Eliminatorias de Futsal Brasil 2020, CONMEBOL.com

2020
Conmebol
2020 in South American futsal
2020 in Brazilian football
2020 Fifa Futsal World Cup qualification (Conmebol)
February 2020 sports events in South America